Victor Manuel Iturriza Álvarez (born 22 May 1990) is a Cuban-born Portuguese handballer who plays for BECA and the Portuguese national team.

He represented Portugal at the 2021 World Men's Handball Championship.

Honours
Porto
Portuguese League: 2018–19, 2020–21
Portuguese Cup: 2018–19, 2020–21
Portuguese Super Cup: 2019, 2021

References

Portuguese male handball players
1990 births
Sportspeople from Havana
Living people
FC Porto handball players
Handball players at the 2020 Summer Olympics

Portuguese people of Cuban descent